The Townsville & Districts Blackhawks are an Australian semi-professional rugby league football club based in Townsville, Queensland. They compete in Queensland's top rugby league competition, the Queensland Cup. The club was admitted to the Queensland Cup in September 2014, first competing in the 2015 season. The side plays their home games at Jack Manski Oval.

History 

The beginnings of a Townsville team's bid to return to the Queensland Cup date back to 2007, when the Townsville-based North Queensland Young Guns folded at the end of the season. Before the Young Guns entered the competition in 2002, Townsville was represented in the Queensland Cup by the Townsville Stingers, who only lasted one season in 1998. In 2008, the Queensland Cup expanded to Cairns with the Northern Pride and Mackay with the Mackay Cutters. Both clubs became feeder sides for the Townsville-based NRL club, the North Queensland Cowboys.

In 2012, the Townsville Brothers League club sent a letter to Townsville & Districts Rugby League (TDRL) chairman Ross Anderson outlining their interest in joining the Queensland Cup.

On 10 September 2014, Queensland Rugby League chairman Peter Betros announced that the Brothers-led Townsville Blackhawks bid had been successful and the side would compete in the 2015 competition. The club will be backed by the North Queensland Cowboys, who will use the Blackhawks as one of their feeder sides, along with the Pride and the Cutters.

On 29 September 2014, former North Queensland Cowboys Under 20s head coach and Brisbane Broncos assistant coach Kristian Woolf was announced as the inaugural head coach of the Blackhawks.

On 16 October 2014, the Blackhawks announced their first six signings for their inaugural season. They included former NRL players Tom Humble, Anthony Mitchell and Ricky Thorby, former North Queensland Cowboys Under 20s players Corey Jensen and Chris McLean, and United States international Taylor Welch.

On 28 February 2015, Daniel Beasley was named inaugural club captain at the team's season launch.

On 7 March 2015, the Blackhawks played their first Queensland Cup game, defeating the Mackay Cutters 30-16 at Jack Manski Oval. Jahrome Hughes scored the club's first try.

The Blackhawks finished their inaugural season as minor premiers and runners-up in the Grand Final, losing to the Ipswich Jets.

On 9 November 2015, it was announced that Townsville’s Cyril Connell (under-16) and Mal Meninga (under-18) Cup sides, formerly known as the Townsville Stingers, will now be known as the Townsville & Districts Blackhawks in their respective competitions.

On 28 September 2018, Aaron Payne was announced as the club's second head coach, after inaugural coach Kristian Woolf joined the Newcastle Knights NRL side as an assistant coach.

Season summaries

Players

2022 squad

Coaches
The Blackhawks' current coach, Aaron Payne, is their second in club history. Kristian Woolf is their longest serving coach.

Emblems and colours
Despite being backed by the Townsville Brothers League Club, the bid team adopted a new name, logo and colour scheme for the club. The Blackhawks moniker was chosen after Matt Cocker, a local firefighter at Townsville Airport, won a "name the team" competition in 2012. The city of Townsville has a military history and is home to an RAAF Base. The club's primary colours are green, black and white and their major sponsor is Mendi Construction, who are based in Townsville.

Honours
 Runners Up: 1
  2015
 Minor Premiership: 1
  2015

Statistics and Records
Biggest Wins

Biggest Losses

Most Consecutive Wins
8, 9 June 2019 – 10 August 2019
8, 22 March 2015 – 17 May 2015

Most Consecutive Losses
4, 10 April 2021 – 9 May 2021
3, 4 August 2018 – 18 August 2018
3, 17 March 2018 – 31 March 2018
3, 12 August 2017 – 3 September 2017

Most Games for Club
84, Kyle Laybutt (2016-2017, 2019-2022)
79, Corey Jensen (2015–2019, 2021)
75, Michael Parker-Walshe (2015–2017, 2019)
72, Anthony Mitchell (2015–2017)
70, Sione Lousi (2017-2021)

Most Tries for Club
70, Jonathon Reuben (2015–2018)
53, Kalifa Faifai Loa (2018–2022)
42, Zac Santo (2015, 2018–2019)
36, Michael Parker-Walshe (2015–2017, 2019)
35, Jaelen Feeney (2018-2022)

Most tries in a match
4, Jonathon Reuben against CQ Capras at Jack Manski Oval (21 May 2017)
4, Rhyse Martin against CQ Capras at Jack Manski Oval (28 March 2015)

Most Goals in a Match
10, Shaun Nona against Souths Logan Magpies at Jack Manski Oval (9 July 2022)
10, Carlin Anderson against Mackay Cutters at Jack Manski Oval (18 March 2017)

Most Points in a Match
28, (2 tries, 10 goals), Carlin Anderson against Mackay Cutters at Jack Manski Oval (18 March 2017)

Most Tries in a Season
31, Zac Santo in 2015

Most Points in a Season
220 (20 tries, 70 goals), Carlin Anderson in 2017

Sponsors 
 Mendi Constructions (Major)
 Phoenix Constructions
 QDP Trenchless
 Parry NQ
 Allara Learning
 KFC
 Bartercard
 The Lancini Group
 VCV Townsville
 Power100
 Townsville Bulletin
 Brothers Leagues Club
 Kirwan Sports Club

See also

National Rugby League reserves affiliations
North Queensland Cowboys
North Queensland Young Guns

References

External links
 Blackhawks Official Website

 
Rugby clubs established in 2014
Sport in Townsville
Rugby league teams in Queensland
2014 establishments in Australia